Wilkinson is a town in Brown Township, Hancock County, Indiana, United States. The population was 449 at the 2010 census.

Located in the northeast corner of Hancock County, the town sits along Indiana State Road 109, which runs north to Anderson and south to I-70 and Knightstown. Wilkinson is about 30 miles east of Indianapolis, and about 12 miles northeast of Greenfield.

History
Wilkinson was platted in 1883 by Elnathan and Thomas B. Wilkinson. The Wilkinson post office was established in 1883.

Geography
Wilkinson is located at  (39.884810, -85.608241).

Demographics

2010 census
As of the census of 2010, there were 449 people, 176 households, and 133 families living in the town. The racial makeup of the town was 99.3% White and 0.7% from two or more races. Hispanic or Latino of any race were 2.0% of the population.

There were 176 households, of which 31.3% had children under the age of 18 living with them, 58.0% were married couples living together, 11.9% had a female householder with no husband present, 5.7% had a male householder with no wife present, and 24.4% were non-families. 19.9% of all households were made up of individuals, and 6.3% had someone living alone who was 65 years of age or older. The average household size was 2.55 and the average family size was 2.83.

The median age in the town was 39.7 years. 25.2% of residents were under the age of 18; 6.6% were between the ages of 18 and 24; 26.9% were from 25 to 44; 26.4% were from 45 to 64; and 14.7% were 65 years of age or older. The gender makeup of the town was 51.7% male and 48.3% female.

2000 census
As of the census of 2000, there were 356 people, 153 households, and 104 families living in the town. The racial makeup of the town was 98.88% White, 0.56% from other races, and 0.56% from two or more races. Hispanic or Latino of any race were 0.84% of the population.

There were 153 households, out of which 32.0% had children under the age of 18 living with them, 58.2% were married couples living together, 5.9% had a female householder with no husband present, and 32.0% were non-families. 26.8% of all households were made up of individuals, and 12.4% had someone living alone who was 65 years of age or older. The average household size was 2.33 and the average family size was 2.83.

In the town, the population was spread out, with 22.5% under the age of 18, 8.4% from 18 to 24, 31.2% from 25 to 44, 23.0% from 45 to 64, and 14.9% who were 65 years of age or older. The median age was 36 years. For every 100 females, there were 96.7 males. For every 100 females age 18 and over, there were 90.3 males.

The median income for a household in the town was $48,750, and the median income for a family was $52,143. Males had a median income of $38,750 versus $25,500 for females. The per capita income for the town was $21,289. About 2.9% of families and 2.5% of the population were below the poverty line, including none of those under age 18 and 7.9% of those age 65 or over.

Notable people
World War I ace Harvey Weir Cook was born and raised in Wilkinson; Indianapolis International Airport's main terminal is named in Colonel H. Weir Cook's honor.

References

Towns in Hancock County, Indiana
Towns in Indiana